The Denver Colorado Temple is the 40th operating temple of the Church of Jesus Christ of Latter-day Saints (LDS Church).

History
The LDS Church announced plans to build a temple in Colorado on March 31, 1982. Almost two years later, Gordon B. Hinckley presided over the site dedication and groundbreaking. The temple is situated on a hilltop in Centennial and was completed in 1986. Hand-carved woodwork adorns the temple interior, along with hand-painted designs on the walls and ceilings. The temple also features more than six hundred square feet of specially designed stained glass windows.

Many Latter-day Saints contributed what they could to the building and beautifying of the Denver Colorado Temple. Some made tatted cloths, children earned money and donated it for the building of three 'bride benches,' young men and women made and assembled a dollhouse to be used in the youth center, and more than six hundred volunteers cleaned the temple before the open house held September 8–27, 1986.

LDS Church president Ezra Taft Benson dedicated the temple on October 24, 1986. In 2016 a second temple in Colorado, the Fort Collins Colorado Temple, was completed. In 1997 the temple was celebrated as part of the 100th-anniversary celebration of the LDS Church in Colorado.

Community reaction
Prior to the construction of the temple, residents were worried a temple in their area would be too big and overshadow everything else. The church let the residents of the neighborhood surrounding the temple grounds pick the final design of the temple.

In 2020, the Denver Colorado Temple was closed in response to the coronavirus pandemic.

Gallery

See also

 Comparison of temples of The Church of Jesus Christ of Latter-day Saints
 List of temples of The Church of Jesus Christ of Latter-day Saints
 List of temples of The Church of Jesus Christ of Latter-day Saints by geographic region
 Temple architecture (Latter-day Saints)
 The Church of Jesus Christ of Latter-day Saints in Colorado

References

External links
 
 Denver Colorado Temple Official site
 Denver Colorado Temple at ChurchofJesusChristTemples.org

20th-century Latter Day Saint temples
Buildings and structures in Arapahoe County, Colorado
Centennial, Colorado
Latter Day Saint movement in Colorado
Religious buildings and structures in Colorado
Religious buildings and structures completed in 1986
Temples (LDS Church) in the United States
1986 establishments in Colorado